Allan Joseph MacEachen  (July 6, 1921 – September 12, 2017) was a Canadian politician and statesman who served as a senator and several times as a Cabinet minister. He was the first deputy prime minister of Canada and served from 1977 to 1979 and 1980 to 1984.

Early life
Born in Inverness on Nova Scotia's Cape Breton Island, MacEachen graduated from St. Francis Xavier University, and lectured in economics for several years at the school. He was the son of Annie Gillies and Angus MacEachen, a coal miner from Inverness County, Nova Scotia. MacEachen's maternal grandfather immigrated to Cape Breton Island from Morar, Scotland, in 1865. MacEachen's parents both spoke the distinctive Nova Scotia dialect of Scottish Gaelic at home and MacEachen himself was a fluent speaker.

Early political career
MacEachen was elected for the first time to the House of Commons of Canada in the 1953 election as a Liberal under the leadership of Prime Minister Louis St-Laurent. MacEachen was re-elected in the 1957 election but was defeated in the Progressive Conservative Diefenbaker sweep in the 1958 election, the largest federal electoral victory in Canadian history.

MacEachen was re-elected to Parliament in the 1962 general election and again in the 1963, 1965, 1968, 1972, 1974, 1979, and 1980 elections.

Cabinet minister
When Lester B. Pearson formed a Liberal government in 1963, he appointed MacEachen to cabinet as Minister of Labour. It was the beginning of a lengthy career in cabinet in which MacEachen served in several portfolios under Prime Ministers Pearson, Pierre Trudeau and John Turner. Over the course of his career, MacEachen held the following portfolios: Labour, National Health and Welfare, Manpower and Immigration, Privy Council, External Affairs, and Finance.

In addition to his ministerial responsibilities, MacEachen served as Government House Leader on three occasions and became the first Deputy Prime Minister of Canada in 1977 under Trudeau, a post that was held whenever Trudeau was in office until the latter retired.

In his memoirs, published in 1993, Trudeau wrote that MacEachen "had a very good strategic sense, both in and out of Parliament, and he lived and breathed politics." For Trudeau, he "was always a source of shrewd advice" and "was the kind of man I respected, because he had no ulterior motives; he said what he thought, and the reasons he would give were always his real reasons."

In 1968 MacEachen contested the leadership of the Liberal Party but did not do well, largely because there was a second Nova Scotian on the ballot. He was courted to run for leader again in 1984 but opted to support John Turner, the eventual winner.

In 1979, when the Liberals lost the election to Joe Clark's Conservatives, MacEachen served as interim Leader of the Opposition when Trudeau announced his retirement from politics. Trudeau's short-lived retirement ended with the defeat of Clark's government in a vote of confidence of his budget and the Liberals' return to power with a majority government on February 18, 1980.

MacEachen took the role of Finance Minister and announced the National Energy Policy as part of his 1980 budget. He also angered public sector unions in his 1982 budget by imposing a wage restraint package dubbed "six and five," which limited wage increases to 6% and 5% for the next two years. That was while double-digit interest rates and inflation were common.

Senator
Turner, the new party leader and prime minister, recommended MacEachen for appointment to the Senate, where MacEachen became Leader of the Government in the Senate. MacEachen was in that position only briefly, as Turner lost the 1984 election, but MacEachen started the practice of allowing opposition senators to chair a number of committees, a practice that continues today.

From 1984 to 1991, he served as leader of the opposition in the Senate, where he was regarded as the primary opposition to the Conservative Brian Mulroney's first term because of Mulroney's substantial majority in the Commons, with an opposition that was spread nearly equally between Turner's Liberals and Ed Broadbent's New Democratic Party. In 1988, after a request by Turner, MacEachen blocked the Canada-U.S. Free Trade Agreement in the Senate to force an election before the issue was settled. The agreement was the main issue of the 1988 election. After Mulroney's victory, MacEachen and the Senate passed the agreement.

After the election, MacEachen again used the Senate to block the introduction of the Goods and Services Tax. Mulroney recommended for appointment several new senators and used an emergency power in the Constitution Act, 1867, to allow him to recommend for appointment eight new senators. MacEachen then led a filibuster against the bill, with Liberal members defying Speaker Guy Charbonneau, who voted for Conservative motions. The Liberal senators used other tactics to delay Senate business. Soon, the motion was passed, and the Progressive Conservative majority passed new rules for the Senate to forbid such actions.

MacEachen retired from the Senate in 1996 after he had reached the mandatory retirement age of 75, and he became a dollar-per-year adviser to the Department of Foreign Affairs and International Trade. Further controversy ensued in 1998, when it was discovered that he was still using a full Senate office.

Retirement and death
After leaving the Senate, MacEachen retired to Nova Scotia spending the rest of his life at his house on Lake Ainslie in Inverness County, Cape Breton and in Antigonish. In 2006, MacEachen endorsed Bob Rae's candidacy to lead the Liberal Party, and was appointed honorary campaign chair of Rae's campaign.

MacEachen died at the age of 96 on September 12, 2017 at St. Martha's Hospital in Antigonish, Nova Scotia.

Honours
In 2008, he was made an Officer of the Order of Canada.

St. Francis Xavier University holds the annual Allan J. MacEachen lecture in his honour. In 2000, the Allan J. MacEachen International Academic and Cultural Centre was opened in Mabou, Nova Scotia. The complex consists of a secondary school, Dalbrae Academy, and Strathspey Place, a performing arts centre. Dalhousie University's MacEachen Institute for Public Policy and Governance is also named after him.

In 2021, Beaton Street, which is where MacEachen was raised in Inverness, Nova Scotia, was renamed Allan J. Memorial Avenue. The renaming coincided with the hundredth anniversary of MacEachen’s birth, and was widely celebrated by many in the small Cape Breton community. Project chair Ben MacKay remarked at the unveiling ceremony that “There is no better example to leave behind for my generation, and all future generations of young people in this country.”

References

External links
 

 

1921 births
2017 deaths
Deputy Prime Ministers of Canada
Canadian Ministers of Finance
Liberal Party of Canada MPs
Members of the House of Commons of Canada from Nova Scotia
Canadian senators from Nova Scotia
Members of the King's Privy Council for Canada
Officers of the Order of Canada
People from Inverness County, Nova Scotia
St. Francis Xavier University alumni
Academic staff of St. Francis Xavier University
Liberal Party of Canada leadership candidates
Canadian Secretaries of State for External Affairs
Canadian Ministers of Health and Welfare
Members of the 19th Canadian Ministry
Members of the 20th Canadian Ministry
Members of the 22nd Canadian Ministry
Members of the 23rd Canadian Ministry